Viljo Armas Antero Leskinen (16 December 1909 – 16 November 1945) was a Finnish sports shooter. He competed in the 50 m rifle event at the 1936 Summer Olympics. In November 1945, Leskinen shot and killed a woman in a dispute and then committed suicide.

References

External links
 

1909 births
1945 deaths
1945 suicides
20th-century Finnish criminals
Finnish male criminals
People from Toholampi
People from Vaasa Province (Grand Duchy of Finland)
Finnish male sport shooters
Olympic shooters of Finland
Shooters at the 1936 Summer Olympics
Murder–suicides in Finland
Suicides by firearm in Finland
Violence against women in Finland
Finnish murderers
Male murderers
Sportspeople from Central Ostrobothnia